Kawan Gabriel da Silva (born 6 March 2002), simply known as Kawan, is a Brazilian footballer who plays as a defensive midfielder for Athletico Paranaense.

Career statistics

Club

Honours
Athletico Paranaense
Campeonato Paranaense: 2020

References

External links
Athletico Paranaense profile 

2002 births
Living people
Sportspeople from Paraná (state)
Brazilian footballers
Brazil youth international footballers
Association football midfielders
Campeonato Brasileiro Série A players
Club Athletico Paranaense players